{{align|right|{{Highlighted world map by country|
Map of V-Dem's 2022 Regimes of the World (RoW)|scale = 80|CA=lightblue|US=darkblue|MX=lightblue|GB=darkblue|IS=darkblue|NO=darkblue|SE=darkblue|FI=darkblue|EE=darkblue|LV=darkblue|LT=lightblue|PL=lightblue|DE=darkblue|DK=darkblue|NL=darkblue|BE=darkblue|FR=darkblue|ES=darkblue|PT=lightblue|IT=darkblue|CH=darkblue|IE=darkblue|GL=black|CZ=darkblue|SK=darkblue|RU=orange|BY=orange|UA=orange|RO=lightblue|AT=lightblue|GR=lightblue|TR=orange|BG=lightblue|RS=orange|MK=lightblue|AL=orange|HU=orange|SI=lightblue|BA=lightblue|ME=lightblue|HR=lightblue|KZ=orange|MN=lightblue|CN=Red|KP=red|KR=darkblue|JP=darkblue|TW=darkblue|PH=orange|UZ=orange|KG=orange|TJ=orange|AF=red|PK=orange|IN=orange|NP=lightblue|BT=lightblue|BD=orange|MM=red|TH=red|VN=red|KH=orange|LA=red|IR=orange|LK=lightblue|ID=lightblue|MY=orange|PG=orange|AU=darkblue|NZ=darkblue|SA=red|YE=red|OM=red|AE=red|BH=red|QA=red|IQ=orange|SY=red|JO=red|IL=darkblue|EG=orange|LY=red|TN=orange|DZ=orange|MA=red|EH=black|MG=orange|MR=orange|CU=red|SD=red|SS=red|ER=red|DJ=orange|ET=orange|SO=red|BR=lightblue|UY=darkblue|AR=lightblue|CL=darkblue|KW=orange|PY=lightblue|BO=lightblue|PE=lightblue|EC=lightblue|CO=lightblue|VE=orange|PA=lightblue|GY=lightblue|SR=lightblue|CR=darkblue|NI=orange|HN=lightblue|SV=orange|GT=orange|HT=orange|DO=lightblue|NE=lightblue|ML=red|BF=red|NG=orange|CM=orange|CF=orange|TD=red|KE=lightblue|ZA=lightblue|NA=lightblue|BW=lightblue|CD=orange|CG=orange|GA=orange|GQ=orange|BZ=black|AZ=orange|AM=lightblue|GE=lightblue|SN=lightblue|GM=lightblue|GW=orange|SL=lightblue|CI=orange|GN=red|PR=black|JM=lightblue|AO=orange|ZM=lightblue|MZ=orange|ZW=orange|MW=lightblue|TZ=orange|UG=orange|BI=orange|RW=orange|BS=black|TK=red|BJ=orange|TG=orange|GH=lightblue|TT=lightblue|LR=lightblue|FK=black|CY=darkblue|TM=red|LB=orange|FJ=orange|SB=lightblue|NC=black|VU=lightblue|MD=lightblue|PS=black|LU=darkblue|BN=black}}

}}

In politics, a regime (also "régime'''") is the form of government or the set of rules, cultural or social norms, etc. that regulate the operation of a government or institution and its interactions with society. The two broad categories of regimes that appear in most literature are democratic and autocratic. However, autocratic regimes can be broken down into a subset of many different types (dictatorial, totalitarian, absolutist, monarchic, oligarchic, etc.). The key similarity between all regimes are the presence of rulers, and either formal or informal institutions.

According to Yale professor Juan José Linz there a three main types of political regimes today: democracies, 
totalitarian regimes and, sitting between these two, authoritarian regimes (with hybrid regimes).

Usage

While the word régime originates as a synonym for any type of government, modern usage has given it a negative connotation, implying an authoritarian government or dictatorship. Webster's definition states that the word régime refers simply to a form of government, while Oxford English Dictionary defines regime as "a government, especially an authoritarian one".

Contemporary academic usage of the term "regime" is broader than popular and journalistic usage, meaning "an intermediate stratum between the government (which makes day-to-day decisions and is easy to alter) and the state (which is a complex bureaucracy tasked with a range of coercive functions)." In global studies and international relations, the concept of regime is also used to name international regulatory agencies (see International regime), which lie outside of the control of national governments. Some authors thus distinguish analytically between institutions and regimes while recognizing that they are bound up with each other:

Regimes can thus be defined as sets of protocols and norms embedded either in institutions or institutionalized practices – formal such as states or informal such as the "liberal trade regime" – that are publicly enacted and relatively enduring.

Urban Regimes
Other regime theorists argue that there are also more localized urban regimes that are categorized by interests, institutions, and ideas in a city. Urban regimes are defined as the relations between local state and polity elites with particular institution forms and policy goals.

Urban regime theorist Jill Clark argues that these regime types are categorized by economic actors and policy-making within a community. The six urban regime types are: entrepreneurial, caretaker, player, progressive, stewardship, and the demand-side.

How are regimes measured?
There are two primary ways in which regimes are measured: continuous measures of democracy (e.g. Freedom House (FH), Polity, and the Varieties of Democracy (V-Dem)) and binary measures of democracy (e.g. Regimes of the World). A continuous measure of democracy creates categorical classifications based on gradations of democracy and autocracy though previously, primarily focused on the differentiation of democracies and autocracies. A binary measure of democracy classifies a country as either a democracy or not.

While some argue that unless a government is “x” or generates “x”, then such an institution is not worthy of being declared a democracy, academics establish that there is no single set of practices that embody democracy, but rather a matrix of various outcomes and combinations. According to Stanford political science professor Philippe C. Schmitter and associate professor Terry Lynn Karl, such matrices take into consideration factors such as consensus, participation, access, responsiveness, majority rule, parliamentary sovereignty, party government, pluralism, federalism, presidentialism, and checks and balances.

V-Dem Institute, an independent research institute that aims to conceptualize and measure democracy, serves as one of the world’s most well-known continuous measures of democracy. V-Dem formally describes their data utilizing a notation that contains ratings of numerous indicators. Such indicators include access to justice, electoral corruption, and freedom from government sponsored violence. V-Dem then relies on country experts who supply subjective ratings of said latent or concealed regime indicators over any given period of time.

See also

 Ancien Régime
 Carbon audit regime
 Exchange rate regime
 International regime
 Legal practice
 Regime change
 Regime theory

 Citations 

 Sources 
 
 O'Neill, Patrick, Essentials of Comparative Government''

Government